In geometry, a dissection problem  is the problem of partitioning a geometric figure (such as a polytope or ball) into smaller pieces that may be rearranged into a new figure of equal content. In this context, the partitioning is called simply a dissection (of one polytope into another). It is usually required that the dissection use only a finite number of pieces. Additionally, to avoid set-theoretic issues related to the Banach–Tarski paradox and Tarski's circle-squaring problem, the pieces are typically required to be well-behaved. For instance, they may be restricted to being the closures of disjoint open sets.

The Bolyai–Gerwien theorem states that any polygon may be dissected into any other polygon of the same area, using interior-disjoint polygonal pieces.  It is not true, however, that any polyhedron has a dissection into any other polyhedron of the same volume using polyhedral pieces (see Dehn invariant). This process is possible, however, for any two honeycombs (such as cube) in three dimension and any two zonohedra of equal volume (in any dimension).

A dissection into triangles of equal area is called an equidissection. Most polygons cannot be equidissected, and those that can often have restrictions on the possible numbers of triangles. For example, Monsky's theorem states that there is no odd equidissection of a square.

See also
Dissection puzzle
Hilbert's third problem
Hinged dissection

References

External links
David Eppstein, Dissection Tiling.

Discrete geometry
Euclidean geometry
Geometric dissection
Polygons
Polyhedra
Polytopes
Mathematical problems